Ștefan Vodă is a city and the administrative centre of Ștefan Vodă District, Moldova. It was known as Suvorovo (Суворовo) during the Soviet period, until 22 May 1990.

See also
 Vocea Basarabiei 103.8, a Romanian language radio station

References

Cities and towns in Moldova
Cetatea Albă County
Ștefan Vodă District